The title archimandrite , used in Eastern Christianity, originally referred to a superior abbot (hegumenos, present participle of the verb meaning "to lead") whom a bishop appointed to supervise several "ordinary" abbots and monasteries, or as the abbot of some especially great and important monastery.

In the Eastern Orthodox Church and the Eastern Catholic Churches "archimandrite" is most often used purely as a title of honor (with no connection to any actual monastery) and is bestowed on a hieromonk as a mark of respect or gratitude for service to the Church. This title is only given to those priests who have been tonsured monks, while distinguished non-monastic (typically married) priests would be given the title of archpriest.

History 

The term derives from the Greek: the first element from  archi- meaning "highest" or from archon "ruler"; and the second root from  mandra meaning "enclosure" or "corral", "pen" and denoting a "monastery" (compare the usage of "flock" for "congregation").

The title has been in common use since the 5th century, but is mentioned for the first time in a letter to Epiphanius, prefixed to his Panarium (ca. 375), but the Lausiac History of Palladius may evidence its common use in the 4th century as applied to Saint Pachomius.

When the supervision of monasteries passed to another episcopal official—the  Great Sakellarios ("sacristan")—the title of archimandrite became an honorary one for abbots of important monasteries (compared to an ordinary abbot, a hegumenos).

Byzantine usage 

The Eastern Orthodox and Byzantine Catholic churches commonly select their bishops from the ranks of the archimandrites.

As abbots, the duties of both a hegumen and an archimandrite are the same; however, during the Divine Service a hegumen wears a simple mantle, while the mantle of an archimandrite is decorated with sacral texts; an archimandrite also bears a pastoral staff (pateritsa).

Kiev Metropolis
Initially in some cases it served as an extra title: for example, manuscripts of 1174 mention Hegumen Polikarp of Kiev Cave Monastery as "Hegumen Archimandrite".

Russian usage 

In 1764 the Russian Orthodox Church organized its monasteries and ranked them in one of three classes, awarding only the abbots at the head of monasteries of the second or first class the title of archimandrite. Abbots of third class monasteries were to be styled "hegumen".

In the Russian tradition an archimandrite wears a mitre.

Greek usage

Churches under the spiritual jurisdiction of the four ancient Eastern Orthodox Patriarchates generally require that such a monastic priest possess a university degree in theology before he is elevated to the rank of archimandrite.  Sometimes the requirement is waived if the priest can show outstanding achievement in other academic fields, such as the humanities or science.

Western usage

An archimandrite who does not function as an abbot has the style "The Very Reverend Archimandrite" whilst one with abbatial duties uses the style "The Right Reverend Archimandrite".

The word occurs in the Regula Columbani (c. 7), and du Cange gives a few other cases of its use in Latin documents, but it never came into vogue in the West; yet, owing to intercourse with Greek and Slavonic Christianity, the title sometimes appears in southern Italy and Sicily, and in Croatia, Hungary and Poland. From 1979 there is at least one exemplar in Britain.

References

 
 Dictionnaire d'archéologie chrétienne et de liturgie (in French)

Further reading

External links 

Christian religious occupations
Eastern Christian ecclesiastical offices
Ecclesiastical titles
Religious leadership roles